The Episcopal Cemetery is a historic Episcopal cemetery and national historic district located at Elizabeth City, Pasquotank County, North Carolina. It is a  cemetery that was opened in 1825.  In 1994, it included one contributing site, 26 contributing structures, and 56 contributing objects.  The cemetery is the burial place of John C. B. Ehringhaus and Tillie Ehringhaus, Governor and First Lady of North Carolina from 1933 to 1937.

It was listed on the National Register of Historic Places in 1994.

References

Cemeteries on the National Register of Historic Places in North Carolina
1825 establishments in North Carolina
Anglican cemeteries in the United States
Buildings and structures in Pasquotank County, North Carolina
National Register of Historic Places in Pasquotank County, North Carolina
Historic districts on the National Register of Historic Places in North Carolina